Mark Harrington is an American anti-abortion activist. From 1999–2011, he was the executive director of the Midwest office of the Center for Bio-Ethical Reform and president of the Pro-Life Institute. In 2011, Harrington became the founder and executive director of Created Equal.

Early life and education 

Harrington grew up in Columbus, Ohio, and graduated from The Ohio State University with a B.A. in Marketing and Economics. He began full-time anti-abortion work in 1998.

Harrington traveled to universities debating students on bio-ethical issues such as abortion, embryonic stem cell research, and cloning.  As part of the Genocide Awareness Project, Harrington spoke on some of the nation's largest university campuses, reaching thousands of college students and faculty each year.

The Mark Harrington Show
Harrington hosts Activist Radio: The Mark Harrington Show. Harrington has appeared in several national newspapers including USA Today, and on national television programs such as CBS' Good Morning.

Use of graphic images 

Harrington is among anti-abortion activists who use images of aborted fetuses in training efforts and public outreach.  This has raised controversy among groups finding the display too graphic. Oftentimes, Created Equal representatives will argue that their use of graphic imagery to raise public awareness about abortion is similar to the use of photographs of Holocaust victims. A counter-demonstration held during a Genocide Awareness Project at Ohio State University included twenty protesters and others who claimed that GAP's tactics were "aggressive, unsettling and intimidating." The anti GAP protesters had banners saying "Keep GAP off campus" and "Stop exploiting the Holocaust."

Harrington's response to criticism of the graphic images includes the following:

References

External links 
 Center for Bio-Ethical Reform-Midwest
 AbortionNo
 createdequal.org
 markharrington.org

Living people
American nonprofit executives
American anti-abortion activists
Year of birth missing (living people)